Tiko United FC is a Cameroonian football club based in Tiko, South West Region They play in Southwest Regional League of the Cameroon Association Football.

History 
It was founded in the early 1960s as C.D.C Tiko. During the late 70s and early 80s, its parent company, the Cameroon Development Corporation gradually relinquished sponsorship. Tea cultivation, being the main company product was eventually taken over by a citizen cooperative in Tiko. It was then renamed Tiko United.

In 2009, the club won the Cameroon Première Division for the first time in its history and a place in CAF Champions League in 2010.

Stadium 
The club played his home matches since 2007 in the Stade de Molyko in Buea, which has a capacity of 100. Tiko played previously until 2006 in the Tiko Town Green Stadium, with 10.000 places.

Achievements
 Cameroon Première Division: 1
 2009.

Cameroon Cup: 0
Super Coupe Roger Milla: 0

Performance in CAF competitions
CAF Champions League: 1 appearance
2010 – First Round

CAF Confederation Cup: 1 appearance
2011 – First Round

Staff

Leading board 

 Board chairman 
 Paul Meoto Njie

 President general
 Charles Eteki Dikonge

 Vice pres general
 Enowmpey Besong

 executive president
 Victor Elame Ikome N'gea

Management 

 Manager
 Maurice Mbatchou

 Director of Sports
 Obale Charles

Sports 

 Head coach
 Ernest Agbor

 Assistant coach
 Dominic Ayissi

Notes 

Football clubs in Cameroon
Sports clubs in Cameroon